Caleidocrinus is a genus of sea lily that lived during the Middle and early Upper Ordovician in what is now the Czech Republic and Wales.

References 

Iocrinidae
Ordovician crinoids
Fossils of Great Britain
Fossils of the Czech Republic
Letná Formation
Ordovician echinoderms of Europe
Middle Ordovician first appearances
Late Ordovician extinctions